Thomas Stewart Patterson FRSE LLD (1872–1949) was a Scottish organic chemist.

Early life and education 
He was born in Greenock, in 1872, but his family came to Edinburgh in his youth and he was then educated at Merchiston Castle School. He then studied Chemistry at Andersonian college in Glasgow under Prof William Dittmar.

He then went to Heidelberg where he gained his first doctorate (PhD) in 1896. He was greatly influenced there by Victor Meyer. Returning to Britain, he was the first Priestley scholar at the University of Birmingham. In 1904, he began lecturing in Chemistry at Glasgow University. In 1919, he became the first Gardiner chair of Organic Chemistry.

Career 
In 1919, he was elected a Fellow of the Royal Society of Edinburgh. His proposers were Alexander Gray, George Alexander Gibson, John Glaister, Diarmid Noel Paton, Ralph Stockman, Thomas Hastie Bryce, Robert Muir, Frederick Orpen Bower and Robert Alexander Houston. He resigned from the Society in 1931.

He retired in 1942 and died in 1949.

Publications

An International Language for Chemistry (1924)

References

1872 births
1949 deaths
Organic chemists
Scottish chemists
People educated at Merchiston Castle School
People from Greenock
Academics of the University of Glasgow
Fellows of the Royal Society of Edinburgh